Alexandra Harris (born 1981) is a British writer and academic. From 2007 to 2017, Harris was a professor in English at the University of Liverpool.
In autumn 2017 Harris took up the post of Professorial Fellow at the University of Birmingham.<ref>[https://www.birmingham.ac.uk/staff/profiles/english/harris-alexandra.aspx University of Birmingham staff page]</ref>
Harris was born in Sussex and has written the books Romantic Moderns, on modernism in inter-war Britain, and Weatherland'' on weather in English art and literature. She has also written a short biography of Virginia Woolf. She was appointed a Fellow of the Royal Society of Literature in 2014.

References

External links

Living people
Academics of the University of Liverpool
Fellows of the Royal Society of Literature
1981 births